Centella erecta, or erect centella, is a member of the carrot family, Apiaceae. It is a perennial herb found throughout temperate regions of the Americas, from New Jersey to Chile.

References

External links

erecta
Flora of the Southeastern United States
Flora of Mexico
Flora of Central America
Flora of the Caribbean
Flora of Colombia
Flora of Venezuela
Flora of Brazil
Flora of Bolivia
Flora of Chile
Flora of Paraguay
Flora of Uruguay
Plants described in 1940
Plants described in 1782